The 2002–2004 European Nations Cup was the fourth edition of the newly reformed European Championship for tier 2 & 3 Rugby Union Nations. This was the second two-year cycled championship, the first to be planned from the start.

The Third division had a controversy development during the 2002–03 season

The European federation decided to reset tournament and change from a "two-years" formula to a double "two-years formula".

There were no relegation, due the 2007 Rugby World Cup – Europe qualification

Pool A 
The highest level was the Pool "A", with five teams:
 
  promoted from "Pool B"

Table

Results

Pool B 
The middle level was the Pool "B", with five teams:
 
 
  promoted from pool "C"

Table

Results

Pool C 
At the lowest level of competition, participated four team:

Semifinals

Third place final

Final

See also 
 2003–2004 European Nations Cup First Division
 2002–2004 European Nations Cup Second Division
 2002–2003 European Nations Cup Third Division

Sources

www.irb.com

2003–04
2003–04 in European rugby union

fr:Championnat européen des nations de rugby à XV 2002-2004
it:Campionato europeo per Nazioni di rugby 2002-2004